"Neva Soft" is a song by British performer Ms. Dynamite. The single was released in the United Kingdom as a digital download on 2 September 2011 and debuted and peaked at number 33 on the UK Chart - marking the eighth top 40 hit for the artist.

Critical reception
Robert Copsey of Digital Spy gave the song a positive review stating:

"Original bad girl pon the radar," she spits over juttering percussion and minimal D&B beats courtesy of oh-so-trendy hitmaker Labrinth, whose production is brimming with earworm hooks - including an anthemic, hands-in-the-air "Woaah-Oh" chant.

Music video
A music video to accompany the release of "Neva Soft" was first released onto YouTube on 12 August 2011 at a total length of three minutes and fifty-five seconds.

Track listing

Chart performance

Release history

References

Ms. Dynamite songs
2011 singles
Song recordings produced by Labrinth
2011 songs
Relentless Records singles